The Women's Épée event of the 2013 World Combat Games was held  in Saint Petersburg, Russia on 26 October.

Medalists

Athlete list

 Joanna Guy
 Xu Anqi
 Ayah Mahdy
 Julia Beljajeva
 Irina Embrich
 Emese Szász
 Rossella Fiamingo
 Choi In-Jeong
 Shin A-Lam
 Ana Maria Brânză
 Violetta Kolobova
 Anna Sivkova
 Tiffany Géroudet
 Sarra Besbes

Results

References
Bracket

Fencing at the 2013 World Combat Games
Combat